Two ships of the Royal Navy have borne the name HMS Calpe, named after an ancient name for the Rock of Gibraltar or Mons Calpe.

 , 14-gun sloop, formerly the Spanish San Josef, captured in 1800 and sold in 1802
 , Type II  launched in 1941, transferred to the Royal Danish Navy in 1952 as the Rolfe Krake, and sold for scrapping in 1966
 , Headquarters of the Royal Naval Reserve at Gibraltar until 1993

Royal Navy ship names